Gordon Wright may refer to:
Gordon Wright (footballer) (1884–1947), English Olympic footballer
Gordon Wright (historian) (1912–2000), American historian
Gordon Wright (politician) (1927–1990), Canadian lawyer and politician
Gordon Wright (rugby league), Australian rugby league footballer